Frese is a surname.

Notable people with this surname include:
 Brenda Frese, American basketball player
 Christel Frese, German athlete
 Frederick Frese, American psychologist
 Marsha Frese, American basketball player
 Martin Frese, Danish football player
 Nolan Frese, American American football player
 Ralph Frese, American conservationist 
 Ralph von Frese, American geophysicist
 Randy Frese, American politician
 Udo Frese, German academic